Cristian Martínez may refer to:

Cristian Martínez (Paraguayan footballer) (born 1983), Paraguyan football left midfielder 
Cristian Martínez (Colombian footballer) (born 1988), Colombian football forward
Cristian Martínez (Andorran footballer) (born 1989), Andorran football winger
Cristian Martínez (Panamanian footballer) (born 1997), Panamanian football midfielder

See also
 Christian Martínez (disambiguation)
 Cristhian Martínez (born 1982), Dominican baseball player